PeterLicht is a German electropop musician and author from Cologne signed with the record label Motor Music, best known for his 2001 single Sonnendeck.

Discography 
All English translations are unofficial.

Albums and EPs 
 6 Lieder (2000, Betrug) - (6 Songs)
 14 Lieder (2001, BMG Modul) - (14 Songs)
 Die Transsylvanische Verwandte ist da // Heiterkeit (2001 BMG Modul) Music and Film - (The Transsylvanian Relative is Here / Cheerfulness)
 Stratosphärenlieder (2003, BMG Modul) - (Stratosphere Songs)
 Lieder vom Ende des Kapitalismus (2006, Motor Music) - (Songs from the End of Capitalism)
 Melancholie und Gesellschaft (2008, Motor Music) - (Melancholy and Society)
 Das Ende der Beschwerde (October 28, 2011, Motor Music) - (The End of the Complaint)
 Lob der Realität (October 3, 2014, Staatsakt) - (Praise of Reality)
 Wenn wir alle anders sind (October 19, 2018, Tapete Records) - (When We Are All Different)

Singles 
 Sonnendeck (2001, BMG Modul) - (Sun Deck)
 Heiterkeit (2002, BMG Modul) - (Cheerfulness)
 Safarinachmittag (2003, BMG Modul) - (Safari Afternoon)
 Die Geschichte vom Sommer (2003, BMG Modul) - (The Story of Summer)
 Wettentspannen (2006, Motor Music) - (Relaxation Contest)
 Das absolute Glück (2006, Motor Music) - (Absolute Happiness)

12" Vinyl 
 Sonnendeck – Remixe (2003, Mofa Schallplatten/Neuton) - (Sun Deck)
 Heiterkeit – Remixe (2002, Mofa Schallplatten/Neuton) - (Cheerfulness)
 Die transsylvanische Verwandte ist da – Remixe (2002, Mofa Schallplatten/Neuton) - (The Transsylvanian Relative is Here)
 Safarinachmittag (2003, BMG Modul) - (Safari Afternoon)
 Die Geschichte vom Sommer (2003, BMG Modul) - (The History of Summer)
 Antilopen (2003, BMG Modul) - (Antelopes)
 Das absolute Glück - Remixe (2006, Motor Music) - (Absolute Happiness)

External links

Websites about PeterLicht 
 Official Website (German)
 Artist Description on the Motor Music site (German)
 'Portrait' on laut.de (German)
 PeterLicht on MySpace (German)
 PeterLicht on Discogs (English)
 PeterLicht on MusicBrainz

Articles 
The following articles are in German:
 Das Phantom der Popper - Artikel auf spiegel.de
 Der Mann ohne Schatten - Konzertrezension auf spiegel.de
 Rezension zu "Lieder vom Ende des Kapitalismus" in der Zeit vom 11. Mai 2006
 Mehr davon, alter Schlawiner  - Artikel in der FAZ vom 2. Juni 2006

Interviews 
The following interviews are in German:
 "Ist das vor uns das Brandenburger Tor?" Interview in der Jungle World vom 10. Mai 2006
 "Es könnte sich alles ändern" Interview in der taz vom 20. Mai 2006

German male musicians
Living people
German male writers
Year of birth missing (living people)